Luiz da Silva (born 1903, date of death unknown) was a Brazilian water polo player. He competed in the men's tournament at the 1932 Summer Olympics.

See also
 Brazil men's Olympic water polo team records and statistics
 List of men's Olympic water polo tournament goalkeepers

References

External links
 

1903 births
Year of death missing
Brazilian male water polo players
Water polo goalkeepers
Olympic water polo players of Brazil
Water polo players at the 1932 Summer Olympics
Sportspeople from Pernambuco